Glutamate receptor, ionotropic kainate 3 is a protein that in humans is encoded by the GRIK3 gene.

This gene encodes a protein that belongs to the ligand-gated ionic channel family. It can coassemble with either GRIK4 or GRIK5 to form heteromeric receptors and acts as an excitatory neurotransmitter at many synapses in the central nervous system. RNA editing in the mRNA has been reported.

See also
 Kainate receptor

References

Further reading

External links 
 

Ionotropic glutamate receptors